The 2022 Albany Great Danes football team represented the University at Albany, SUNY as a member of the Colonial Athletic Association (CAA) during the 2022 NCAA Division I FCS football season. The Great Danes, led by ninth-year head coach Greg Gattuso, played their home games at Bob Ford Field at Tom & Mary Casey Stadium.

Previous season

The Great Danes finished the 2021 season with an overall record of 2–9 and a mark of 1–7 in CAA conference play to finish in last place.

Schedule

Game summaries

at No. 10 (FBS) Baylor

New Hampshire

at Fordham

Central Connecticut

Hampton

at Villanova

Stony Brook

at No. 19 Elon

Maine

at Rhode Island

References

Albany
Albany Great Danes football seasons
Albany Great Danes football